Viktor Olegovich Imrekov (born 14 December 1985) is a former Russian professional football player.

Club career
He made his Russian Football National League debut for FC Dynamo Makhachkala on 8 May 2006 in a game against FC Ural Yekaterinburg.

Personal life
His twin brother Arkadi Imrekov and father Oleg Imrekov are also professional footballers.

External links
 

1985 births
Sportspeople from Omsk
Living people
Russian footballers
Twin sportspeople
Russian twins
FC Dynamo Moscow reserves players
FC KAMAZ Naberezhnye Chelny players
FC Vityaz Podolsk players
FC Zvezda Irkutsk players
Association football midfielders
FC Mashuk-KMV Pyatigorsk players
FC Dynamo Makhachkala players